The Kootenay Canal is a hydroelectric power station, located 19 km downstream of Nelson, British Columbia, Canada. Where the Kootenay River flows out of the reservoir formed by the Corra Linn Dam on Kootenay Lake., a canal diverts water to BC Hydro's Kootenay Canal Generating Station. Its construction was a result of the Duncan Dam and Libby Dam providing year round flows into Kootenay Lake. The powerhouse was completed in 1976.

Diversion
Water enters the canal from the Corra Linn headpond and for much of the year is diverted 4.5 km past Corra Linn Dam, City of Nelson Powerhouse, Upper Bonnington, Lower Bonnington and South Slocan. By diverting water past the older and smaller dams Kootenay Canal can generate more power due to greater head and more modern generators.

Powerhouse
After passing through the canal and dropping 84 meters through the powerhouse containing four water turbine-electrical generator units, water then returns to the river.
Power generated at
Kootenay Canal plant is fed into BC Hydro's provincial grid via two lines running south to Selkirk Switching Station, near the Seven Mile Generating Station.

Expansion 
In 1999 the four turbines were upgraded and increased the output to a total of 583 MW. Kootenay Canal and Seven Mile generating stations together supplied 10% of BC Hydro's electricity requirements.

Canal plant agreement
Under the terms of the Columbia River Treaty, the Province of British Columbia is entitled to downstream benefits resulting from dam construction. Both the Duncan Dam above Kootenay lake and Lake Koocanusa created by the Libby Dam 200 kilometers upstream in Montana, are covered by the treaty and result in a constant supply of water into Kootenay Lake, and to the many Columbia River dams downstream. BC Hydro is allowed to divert water from five older hydroelectric plants owned by FortisBC and the City of Nelson. Fortis receives the amount of power their generating stations would have produced. Downstream the Brilliant Dam is in the agreement. On the Pend d'Oreille River the Seven Mile Dam and the Waneta Dam are also in the agreement.

See also 

 Hydroelectric dams on the Columbia River
 List of generating stations in British Columbia

References

External links
 BC Hydro - Kootenay Canal Recreation site infopage
 Aerial image, BC Hydro
Canals in British Columbia
West Kootenay
Dams on the Kootenay River
Hydroelectric power stations in British Columbia
Canals opened in 1976
BC Hydro
1976 establishments in British Columbia